Soft Rock was the last official release by Minneapolis band Lifter Puller. Released in 2002, it was a compilation of nearly all of the band's songs—save those found on their final studio album, Fiestas and Fiascos—and a few other odds and ends. The version of "Lie Down on Landsdowne" contained on Soft Rock differs from that found on Fiascos.

Track listing

Disc 1
Tracks 1-6 are B-sides/singles/rarities.
Tracks 7-17 are from the album Half Dead and Dynamite
Tracks 18-21 are B-sides/rarities/unreleased.
"Secret Santa Cruz"
"Back in Blackbeard"
"Math Is Money"
"4 Dix"
"La Quereria"
"Lie Down on Landsdowne"
"To Live and Die in LBI"
"I Like the Lights"
"Sherman City"
"Nassau Coliseum"
"Kool NYC"
"Half Dead and Dynamite"
"The Bears
"Hardware"
"The Gin and the Sour Defeat"
"Viceburgh"
"Rock for Lite Brite"
"11th Ave Freezeout"
"The Langelos"
"Mick's Tape"
"The Pirate and the Penpal"

Disc 2
Tracks 1-6 are from the EP The Entertainment and Arts
Tracks 7-19 are from the album Lifter Puller
"Plymouth Rock"
"The Candy Machine and My Girlfriend"
"Sangre De Stephanie"
"Roaming the Foam"
"Star Wars Hips"
"Let's Get Incredible"
"Double Straps"
"Bloomington"
"Star Wars Hips"
"Bruce Bender"
"Lazy Eye"
"The Mezzanine Gypoff"
"Jeep Beep Suite"
"Rental"
"Solid Gold Sole"
"Sublet"
"Summerhouse"
"Mission Viejo"
"Mono"

References

Lifter Puller albums
2002 compilation albums